The Kindley House is a historic house at 503 Charlotte Street in Gravette, Arkansas.  It is a two-story brick building, set on a heavy stone foundation, with a hip roof and an L-shape configuration that includes a small single-story section in the crook of the L.  There is a porch that is decorated with heavy Italianate scrollwork.  Built in the 1870s of locally made brick, it is one of a number of high-quality Italianate brick houses in Benton County.

The house was listed on the National Register of Historic Places in 1988.

The Kindley House is now home to the Gravette Historical Museum.

See also
National Register of Historic Places listings in Benton County, Arkansas

References

Houses on the National Register of Historic Places in Arkansas
Italianate architecture in Arkansas
Houses completed in 1873
Houses in Benton County, Arkansas
Museums in Benton County, Arkansas
National Register of Historic Places in Benton County, Arkansas
1873 establishments in Arkansas
Historic house museums in Arkansas
Gravette, Arkansas